The defending champions were Scott Davis and David Pate, but they were defeated by Diego Nargiso and Stefano Pescosolido in the first round.
Second-seeded pair Rick Leach and Jim Pugh won in the final against Bret Garnett and Greg Van Emburgh.

Seeds
Champion seeds are indicated in bold text while text in italics indicates the round in which those seeds were eliminated.

  Scott Davis /  David Pate (first round)
  Rick Leach /  Jim Pugh (champions)
  Ken Flach /  Robert Seguso (semifinals)
  Brian Garrow /  Brad Pearce (quarterfinals)

Draw

References

1991 U.S. Men's Clay Court Championships